Oskan may refer to:

 Öskən, Azerbaijan
 Shelayna Oskan-Clarke (born 1990), British athlete
 a character from The Icemark Chronicles

See also 
 Oscan, a language of ancient Italy 
 Oksen (disambiguation)